Shade: Queens of NYC is a television series on the network Fusion TV. It premiered in October 2017.

Cast
 Jesse Havea a.k.a. Brita Filter
 Marti Gould Cummings
 Justin Nako a.k.a. Chelsea Piers
 Nathan McManus a.k.a. Holly Box-Springs
 William Bailey a.k.a. Jada Valenciaga 
 Chris Yoon a.k.a. Jasmine Rice LaBeija
 Daniel Kelley a.k.a. Paige Turner
 Kristian Seeber a.k.a. Tina Burner
 Blake Allen

Episodes

Discography
A Very Marti Holiday, which features cast members Marti Gould Cummings, Tina Burner, and Jasmine Rice LaBeija, includes holiday classics sung by Daphne Rubin-Vega, Tony Award Winner Cady Huffman, Olivier Award Winner Lesli Margherita, Grammy Award Winner Tim Young, Jelani Remy, and Kristina Nicole Miller. The album features musical arrangements by cast member Blake Allen and raises money for Ali Forney Center.

See also
 LGBT culture in New York City

References

External links
 

2010s American reality television series
2017 American television series debuts
American LGBT-related reality television series
Drag (clothing) television shows
English-language television shows